Halotron I is a fire extinguishing agent based on the raw material HCFC-123 (93%) mixed with tetrafluoromethane and argon as propellants.

Global emission concerns
It was originally introduced in 1992 to replace the severely ozone-depleting Halon 1211 (bromochlorodifluoromethane). Halon 1211 has a global warming potential of 1890, whereas Halotron I's GWP is 77, being a 96% reduction.

Performance
In December 2011, Halotron I was tested against "hidden fires", spurred by the effectiveness its predecessor demonstrated on an in-flight fire aboard a Delta L-1011 flight on March 17, 1991. The test was conducted at UL, and demonstrated similar effectiveness as Halon 1211, with significantly less human and global harm. Although the fire extinguishing effectiveness is similar, Halotron I requires a larger chemical volume to get the same ratings as Halon 1211.

DOT classification 
UN1956, Compressed Gases, N.O.S., Nonflammable Gas. IMCO CLASS: 2.2

References

Firefighting equipment
Fire suppression agents